Chaps are protective clothing for the legs.

Chaps may also refer to:

Chaps (brand), a brand of Ralph Lauren Corporation
The Brothers Chaps, creators of the Homestar Runner series of animated cartoons
Gaiters, or half-chaps

CHAPS may refer to:
CHAPS, Clearing House Automated Payment System, a British financial company
Combined heat and power solar, a photovoltaic technology
CHAPS (health organisation), a partnership of UK organisations promoting gay men's health
CHAPS detergent, zwitterionic detergent used in the laboratory to solubilize biological macromolecules such as proteins

See also
Chap (disambiguation)
Chappes (disambiguation)